Barzel is a Hebrew surname. Notable people with the surname include:

Amnon Barzel (born 1935), Israeli curator and writer
Ann Barzel (1905–2007), American writer, critic and dance lecturer
Rainer Barzel (1924–2006), German politician
Yoram Barzel (born 1931), Israeli economist